Orkney Rugby Football Club is a rugby union club located in the town of Kirkwall, Scotland.

History

Orkney RFC was founded in 1966.

In recent years Orkney have progressed through the regional league system to play in Scotland's national league set-up. This was a position they maintained for 4 years.

In season 2018–19, despite beating the Division 3 champions elect Gordonians at the end of March 2019, Perthshire's win at Caithness ensured that Orkney would be relegated back into the regional league system.

Women's side

The club run a women's side.

Orkney Sevens

The club run the Orkney Sevens tournament.

Honours

Orkney Sevens
 Champions: 1967, 1972, 1973, 1976, 1977, 1980, 1982, 1983, 1984, 1986, 1988, 1989, 1996, 1998, 2001, 2009, 2010, 2012, 2013, 2014, 2018, 2019
 Shetland Sevens
 Champions: 2008
 Brin Cup
 Champions (10): 1977–78, 1979–80, 1980–81, 1982–83, 1983–84, 1986–87, 1987–88, 1990–91, 1995–96, 1996–97
 Highland District League
 Champions (7): 1977–78, 1978–79, 1979–80, 1980–81, 1983–84, 1986–87, 1990–91
 Corstorphine Easter Tournament
 Champions (2): 1984–85, 1987–88
 Caithness Sevens
 Champions: 1978, 1979, 1982, 1983, 1986, 1988, 1989, 1992, 1994
 North League
 Champions (2): 1995–96, 1996–97
 Zanussi Sevens
 Champions (1): 1995-96
 National League Division 5 North
 Champions (1): 2001-02

References

Rugby clubs established in 1966
Scottish rugby union teams
Kirkwall
Rugby union in Orkney
1966 establishments in Scotland